John I (28 May 137110 September 1419) was a scion of the French royal family who ruled the Burgundian State from 1404 until his death in 1419. He played a key role in French national affairs during the early 15th century, particularly in the struggles to rule the country for the mentally ill King Charles VI, his cousin, and the Hundred Years' War with England. A rash, ruthless and unscrupulous politician, John murdered the King's brother, the Duke of Orléans, in an attempt to gain control of the government, which led to the eruption of the Armagnac–Burgundian Civil War in France and in turn culminated in his own assassination in 1419.

The involvement of Charles, the heir to the French throne, in his assassination prompted John's son and successor Philip to seek an alliance with the English, thereby bringing the Hundred Years' War to its final phase.

John played an important role in the development of gunpowder artillery in European warfare, making extensive and successful use of it in his military campaigns.

Early life
John was born in Dijon on 28 May 1371 to Duke Philip the Bold of Burgundy and Countess Margaret III of Flanders. On the death of his maternal grandfather Count Louis II of Flanders in 1384, he received the County of Nevers.

In 1385, a double wedding for the Burgundian family took place in Cambrai. John married Margaret, daughter of Count Albert I of Holland, while at the same time his sister Margaret married Albert's son William in order to consolidate John's position in the Low Countries. The marriage took place after John cancelled his engagement to his first cousin, Catherine, a daughter of King Charles V of France, who was only a child at the time.

Before his accession to the Duchy of Burgundy, John was one of the principal leaders of the French forces sent to aid King Sigismund of Hungary in his war against Sultan Bayezid I. John fought in the Battle of Nicopolis of 25 September 1396 with such enthusiasm and bravery that he was given the cognomen Fearless (Sans-Peur). Despite his personal bravery, his impetuous leadership ended in disaster for the European expedition. He was captured and did not recover his liberty until the next year after an enormous ransom was paid.

Conflict with Orléans

John inherited the Duchy of Burgundy in 1404 upon the death of his father and the counties of Burgundy, Flanders, and Artois on his mother's death in 1405. He almost immediately entered into open conflict with Duke Louis I of Orléans, the younger brother of the increasingly disturbed King Charles VI of France. Both men attempted to fill the power vacuum left by the demented king.

John played a game of marriages by exchanging his daughter Margaret of Burgundy for Michelle of Valois, who would marry his heir, Philip the Good. For her part, Margaret was married to Louis, Duke of Guyenne, the heir to the French throne from 1401 until his death in 1415.  For all his concentration on aristocratic politics, John nonetheless did not overlook the importance of the middle class of merchants and tradesmen or the University of Paris.

Louis tried to gain the favour of the wife of Charles VI, Queen Isabeau of France, and may have become her lover. After his son-in-law, the Dauphin Louis, was successively kidnapped and recovered by both parties, the Duke of Burgundy managed to gain appointment by royal decree—during one of the King's "absent" periods when mental illness manifested itself—as guardian of the Dauphin and the King's children. This did not improve relations between John and the Duke of Orléans. Soon the two rivals descended into making open threats. Their uncle, John, Duke of Berry, secured a vow of solemn reconciliation on 20 November 1407, but only three days later, on 23 November 1407, Louis was brutally assassinated in the streets of Paris. The order, no one doubted, had come from the Duke of Burgundy, who shortly admitted to the deed and declared it to be a justifiable act of "tyrannicide". According to Thomas Walsingham, Orléans had simply received his just deserts as he had been "taking his pleasure with whores, harlots, incest" and had committed adultery with the wife of an unnamed knight who had taken his revenge by killing him under the protection of the Duke of Burgundy. After an escape from Paris and a few skirmishes against the Orléans party, John managed to recover the King's favour. In the treaty of Chartres, signed on 9 March 1409, the King absolved the Duke of Burgundy of the crime, and he and Louis' son Charles pledged a reconciliation. A later edict renewed John's guardianship of the Dauphin.

He moved further closer to securing the Regency for himself when he had Jean de Montagu, Grand Master of France and the King's long standing favorite and administrator aligned with the Orleanists, arrested during another one of Charles' manic episodes, and after an expedited summary trial carried out by the Burgundian-aligned politicians, Montagu was beheaded at the Gibbet of Montfaucon on 17 October 1409.

Even with the Orléans dispute resolved in his favour, John did not lead a tranquil life. Charles, the son and heir of the murdered Duke of Orleans, was only 14 at the time of his father's death and was forced to depend heavily on allies to support his claims for the property that had been confiscated from him by the Duke of Burgundy. Chief among these allies was his father-in-law Bernard VII, Count of Armagnac. Because of this alliance, their faction became known as the Armagnacs in opposition to the Burgundians. With peace between the factions solemnly sworn in 1410, John returned to Burgundy and Bernard remained in Paris, where he reportedly shared the Queen's bed. The Armagnac party was not content with its level of political power, and after a series of riots and attacks against the citizens, John was recalled to the capital, then sent back to Burgundy in 1413. At this time, King Henry V of England invaded French territory and threatened to attack Paris. During the peace negotiations with the Armagnacs, Henry was also in contact with John, who was keen to wrest control of France away from King Charles VI. Despite this, he continued to be wary of forming an alliance with the English for fear of destroying his immense popularity with the common people of France. When Henry demanded Burgundy's support for his claim to be the rightful King of France, John backed away and decided to ally himself with the Armagnacs. Although he talked of helping his sovereign, his troops took no part in the Battle of Agincourt in 1415, although two of his brothers, Antoine, Duke of Brabant, and Philip II, Count of Nevers, died fighting for France during the battle.

Conflict with the Dauphin

Two years later, with the rivalry between Burgundians and Armagnacs at an all-time high because of the shattering defeat at Agincourt, John's troops set about the task of capturing Paris. On 30 May 1418, he did capture the city, but not before the new Dauphin, the future Charles VII of France, had escaped. John then installed himself in Paris and made himself protector of the King. Although not an open ally of the English, John did nothing to prevent the surrender of Rouen in 1419. With the whole of northern France in English hands and Paris occupied by Burgundy, the Dauphin tried to bring about a reconciliation with John. They met in July and swore peace on the bridge of Pouilly, near Melun. On the grounds that peace was not sufficiently assured by the meeting at Pouilly, a fresh interview was proposed by the Dauphin to take place on 10 September 1419 on the bridge at Montereau. John of Burgundy was present with his escort for what he considered a diplomatic meeting. He was, however, assassinated by the Dauphin's companions. He was later buried in Dijon. Following this, his son and successor Philip the Good formed an alliance with the English, which would prolong the Hundred Years' War for decades and cause incalculable damage to France and its subjects.

Family
John and his wife Margaret, who married in 1385, had:
Catherine (1391–1414, Ghent), promised in 1410 to a son of Louis of Anjou
Marie (1393–1463, Monterberg bei Kalkar). She married Adolph I, Duke of Cleves;
Margaret (1393–1442, Paris), married on 30 August 1404 Louis of Valois the Dauphin (heir of king Charles VI of France), then in 1423 Arthur de Richemont, the future Duke of Brittany;
Philip ΙΙΙ (1396–1467) son and heir;
Isabelle (died 1412, Rouvres), married at Arras on 22 July 1406 to Olivier de Châtillon-Blois, Count of Penthièvre and Périgord;
Joanna (born 1399, Bouvres), died young;
Anne (1404–1432, Paris), married John, Duke of Bedford
Agnes (1407–1476, Château de Moulins), married Charles I, Duke of Bourbon.

John and his mistress Agnes de Croy, daughter of Jean I de Croÿ, had the following child:
 John of Burgundy, Bishop of Cambrai

John and his mistress Marguerite de Borsele had the following children:
 Guy of Burgundy, Lord of Kruibeke (killed at the siege of Calais in 1436), married Johanna, illegitimate daughter of Albert I, Duke of Bavaria.
 Antoine of Burgundy.
 Philipotte of Burgundy, Lady of Joncy, married Antoine of Rochebaron, Baron of Berze-le-Chatel.

Ancestry

Titles

  1384–1404: Count of Nevers as John I
  27 April 140410 September 1419: Duke of Burgundy as John I
  21 March 140510 September 1419: Count Palatine of Burgundy as John I
  21 March 140510 September 1419: Count of Artois as John I
  21 March 140510 September 1419: Count of Flanders as John I
  27 April 140428 January 1405: Count of Charolais as John I

See also
Dukes of Burgundy

References

Sources

External links

Jean sans Peur/John the Fearless. Archived.
Tour Jean-sans-Peur (in French)
One of John the Fearless' rings (in French)

1371 births
1419 deaths
15th century in the Burgundian Netherlands
15th-century peers of France
15th-century monarchs in Europe
Assassinated French people
Burgundian faction
Burials at Champmol
Christians of the Battle of Nicopolis
Christians of the Barbary Crusade
Counts of Burgundy
Counts of Flanders
Counts of Artois
Counts of Nevers
Duchy of Burgundy
Dukes of Burgundy
French prisoners of war in the 14th century
House of Valois-Burgundy
Medieval murder victims
People from Dijon
People murdered in France
Nobility of the Burgundian Netherlands
People of the Hundred Years' War
Philip the Good (Duke of Burgundy)
Royal reburials